A row crop is a crop that can be planted in rows wide enough to allow it to be tilled or otherwise cultivated by agricultural machinery, machinery tailored for the seasonal activities of row crops. Such crops are sown by drilling or transplanting rather than broadcasting. They are often grown in market gardening (truck farming) contexts or in kitchen gardens. Growing row crops first started in Ancient China in the 6th century BC.

The distinction is significant in crop rotation strategies, where land is planted with row crops, commodity food grains, and sod-forming crops in a sequence meant to protect the quality of the soil while maximizing the soil's annual productivity.

As much of 20% of crops worldwide are irrigated, with some crops such as rice and maize benefiting from the extra water. During the growing season, the inter-row spaces are hoed two to four times and the rows are weeded to conserve moisture and improve aeration. As a result, the soil's microbiological activity increases and mobilization of nutrients is intensified. Row crops are valuable precursors of spring grain crops, flax, and hemp. The beneficial effect of row crops extends to the second crop.

Examples of row crops include
sunflower,
potato,
canola,
dry bean,
field pea,
flax,
safflower,
buckwheat,
cotton,
maize,
soybeans, and
sugar beets.

References

 
Chinese inventions